The Jacksons: An American Dream is a five-hour American miniseries broadcast in two halves on ABC and originally broadcast on November 15 through November 18, 1992. It is based upon the history of the Jackson family, one of the most successful musical families in show business, and the early and successful years of the popular Motown group The Jackson 5.

The miniseries was executive produced by Suzanne de Passe and Stan Margulies, produced by Joyce Eliason, Jermaine Jackson and Margaret Maldonado, and directed by Karen Arthur. The movie was filmed in Los Angeles and Pittsburgh, where director Arthur had previously filmed her feature film Lady Beware.

The Jacksons: An American Dream is based on Katherine Jackson's My Family autobiography. A critical and commercial success, the program won an Emmy Award for Outstanding Individual Achievement in Choreography, while the performances of Hilton-Jacobs and Bassett received widespread acclaim. The title alludes to the iconic concept of the "American Dream".

Plot
The miniseries stars Lawrence Hilton-Jacobs as the Jacksons' patriarch Joseph Jackson, Angela Bassett as the family matriarch Katherine Jackson. Alex Burrall, Jason Weaver and Wylie Draper played Michael Jackson in different eras, while Bumper Robinson and Terrence Howard played Jackie Jackson in different eras, Shakiem Jamar Evans and Angel Vargas played Tito Jackson, Margaret Avery played Katherine's mother, Martha Scruse, Holly Robinson Peete played Diana Ross, Billy Dee Williams played Berry Gordy and Vanessa Williams played Suzanne de Passe. The opening sequence of the film features footage of the real Jacksons rehearsing, performing on stage, a few clips from the "Can You Feel It" music video, album covers, magazine covers, a snippet from their cartoon, and pictures of the family.
The film is mostly based on the autobiography written by Katherine Jackson, and issued in 1990, entitled My Family. The entire mini-series spans a period of about 40 years.

Part one of the film is based on young Katherine and Joseph meeting and courting in the 1940s and showing how they managed to start out raising their children in Gary, Indiana in the 1950s and 1960s, how Joseph discovers the children have talent and starts entering them in talent shows, and finally how The Jackson 5 go on to have early fame and face its consequences in the late 1960s.

Part two of the film deals with the struggles of young Michael Jackson as he faces his brothers marrying early into The Jackson 5's success, his problems with acne as a teenager, and the group's eventual switch to Epic Records in the 1970s, his eventual solo superstardom based on the success of his albums Off the Wall and Thriller, the commercial mishap that caused his hair to ignite, and his legendary Motown 25 performance of "Billie Jean", as well as his difficult relationship with his father in the 1980s.

Michael Jackson's voice is heard on: "Beat It", "Human Nature", "Billie Jean", "I Want You Back", "I Wanna Be Where You Are", "I'll Be There", "Rockin' Robin", "ABC", and "Dancing Machine".  On all other songs, the Michael Jackson vocal part is performed by Anthony Harrell, Jason Weaver or Kipp Lennon.

Cast
 Lawrence Hilton-Jacobs as Joe Jackson
 Angela Bassett as Katherine Jackson
 Holly Robinson Peete as Diana Ross
 Margaret Avery as Martha Scruse
 Billy Dee Williams as Berry Gordy
 Vanessa Williams as Suzanne de Passe
 Wylie Draper as Michael Jackson
 Abolade David Olatunde as Michael Jackson (baby)
 Alex Burrall as Michael Jackson (ages 6–8)
 Jason Weaver as Michael Jackson (ages 9–14)
 Colin Steele as Jermaine Jackson
 Jermaine Jackson Jr. as Jermaine Jackson (ages 10–17)
 Terrence Howard as Jackie Jackson
 Bumper Robinson as Jackie Jackson (ages 13–17)
 Monica Calhoun as Rebbie Jackson
 Ebonie Smith as La Toya Jackson
 Kelli Martin as La Toya Jackson (ages 8–10)
 Angel Vargas as Tito Jackson
 Shakiem Jamar Evans as Tito Jackson (ages 11–15)
 Maya Nicole Johnson as Janet Jackson 
 Monica Allison as Hazel Gordy
 Robert Redcross as Randy Jackson 
 Nicolas Phillips as Randy Jackson (ages 7–9)
 Marcus Maurice as Marlon Jackson
 Floyd Myers Jr. as Marlon Jackson (ages 7–9)
 Jacen Wilkerson as Marlon Jackson (ages 10–15)
 Amanda Hall as Danielle

Reception
The Jacksons: An American Dream became one of the most popular and successful music-biography miniseries of the 1990s. Part 1 of the miniseries was the third highest-rated program broadcast during the week of November 9–15 with a 21.1 rating. Part 2 of the miniseries was watched by 38.4 million viewers in 22.3 million households becoming the highest-rated program broadcast during the week of November 16–22 posting a 23.9 rating, and 36 share. Overall, the miniseries was watched in 38.3 million households and posted a 22.3 rating and 33 share.

The series won an Emmy Award for Outstanding Individual Achievement in Choreography, and was also nominated for Outstanding Individual Achievement in Hairstyling for a Miniseries or a Special, Outstanding Miniseries, and Outstanding Sound Mixing for a Drama Miniseries or a Special.

Bumper Robinson won a Young Artist Award for Best Young Actor in a Television Movie, and Alex Burrall and Jason Weaver both won a special award for Outstanding Young Performers Starring in a Mini-Series. The miniseries was later rebroadcast on VH1 and released to VHS and DVD. The DVD version of the miniseries was released as a two-disc set. The first disc was named "The Early Years" and the second disc was named "The Success Years".

The miniseries aired frequently after the death of Michael Jackson. Along, with that came the shock of the death of Wylie Draper, who passed away from leukemia just one year after the miniseries’ release. It has been shown on TV One, BET, Centric and VH1.

Soundtrack

Track listing
All songs performed by the Jackson 5 except where noted.

 "Who's Lovin' You" [Live] - 5:39
 Recorded live in Gary, Indiana on May 29, 1971
 "Kansas City" (Jason Weaver) - 2:19
 "I'll Be There" (Originally on Third Album)- 3:56
 "In the Still of the Night" (Boyz II Men) - 2:51
 "Walk On/The Love You Save" [Live] - 6:05
 Recorded live in Gary, Indiana on May 29, 1971
 "I Wanna Be Where You Are" (Jason Weaver) - 4:21
 "Dancing Machine" (Originally on G.I.T.: Get It Together) - 3:17
 "The Dream Goes On" (Jermaine Jackson) - 3:50
 "I Want You Back/ABC" [Live] - 3:23
 Recorded live at the Forum, Los Angeles, California on August 26, 1972 (later issued in its entirety on Live at the Forum in 2010)
 "Stay with Love" (Jermaine Jackson and Syreeta) - 4:19
 "Never Can Say Goodbye" (Originally on Maybe Tomorrow)- 2:59
 "You Are the Ones (Interlude)" (3T) - 1:51
 "Dancing Machine [Remix]" - 3:43

Charts

See also
 Man in the Mirror: The Michael Jackson Story''

References

External links
 
 

The Jackson 5
1990s American television miniseries
American biographical series
African-American television
Motown Productions films
American Broadcasting Company original programming
Films directed by Karen Arthur
Biographical films about Michael Jackson
Television series by Universal Television